Wonersh is a village and civil parish in the Waverley district of Surrey, England and Surrey Hills Area of Outstanding Natural Beauty.  Wonersh contains three Conservation Areas and spans an area three to six miles SSE of Guildford.  

Wonersh's economy is predominantly a service sector economy. Three architecturally-listed churches are within its boundaries as are a number of notable homes such as Frank Cook's 1905 hilltop mansion, which is a hotel, business and wedding venue.

History

Etymology
State records show the name as Wonherche, (14th century); Ognersh and Ignersh, (16th and 17th centuries). The form Woghenersh, in a Charter roll of 1305, indicates the (Old English) formation (aet) wogan ersce, 'at the crooked field'.

Pre-Roman settlement
Finds have been found in the hamlet and forest of Blackheath of mesolithic (Stone Age) flint implements and near Chinthurst Hill.

Middle Ages
Based on foundations and core of the church, a settlement has existed in Wonersh village centre since Anglo-Saxon times.

An ilex (holly) tree stood in the garden of Green Place and estimates of its age ranged up to 1200 years. This certainly appears to support the existent of an ancient settlement in the area, as the ilex is not an indigenous species.

Wonersh is not named in the Domesday Book of 1086. All the six manors: Tangley or Great Tangley; Little Tangley; Halldish; Losterford/Lostiford above the intact mill and mill house by the village; Rowleys and; Chinthurst (partly in Shalford) were later built on lands then in Bramley and Shalford. Great Tangley Manor in 1582 became the residence of John and Lettice Carrill and descended to their grandson John Carrill (d. 1656) and his widow Hester, who secondly married Sir Francis Duncombe.

The church of Wonersh was formerly a chapel (of Shalford), and as such the advowson (right to appoint the vicar) was in the presentation of the King who later transferred it to St Mary without Bishopsgate in London; after this it was held by a line of nobles until bought in the 19th century by the lord of the manor. As a chapel, the great tithes were commuted for £700 and the lesser for the vicar for £17.

Post Renaissance
Until Charity Commission amalgamation in 1908, Wonersh had charity endowments paying out for its poor: John Austen of Shalford left money for poor relief in 1620.  Henry Chennell of Wonersh left land whose produce was to be devoted to putting six poor boys to school from 1672. A Mr Gwynne of London gave land and bank stock in 1698 to put four poor boys to school and to distribute bread to fifteen poor persons every Sunday after service.  Manorial fortunes became more muted from 1700 to 1900 during the Industrial Revolution – seeing almost all of their farm lands being sold up for lack of scale or produce.

Wonersh was one of the flourishing seats of the clothing trade in West Surrey. The special manufacture was blue cloth, dyed, no doubt, with woad, licence to grow which was asked in the neighbourhood in the 16th century.

Wonersh Park was a lightly wooded park now public Green in front of and beside the church. Through the park runs a small stream and its 17th century stone gatehouse houses a protected species of bat. Wonersh Park, a 17th-century mansion, was demolished in 1935. Owners were: the original owner of the demolished building Richard Gwynn, who died in 1701, and it passed by issue's marriage to 1710 Sir William Chapple, serjeant-at-law and later judge who probably rebuilt it; later passing in 1741 to Fletcher Norton, 1st Baron Grantley of Grantley in Yorkshire, leading government lawyer created Lord Grantley in 1782. His family held Wonersh Park until 1884 on a sale to Mr. Sudbury.

In 1848 the Cranleigh Water here was used for coal, building materials and agricultural produce as part of the Wey and Arun Canal and the west boundary formed an economic draw of the village.  The Northbrook's mill, used for dressing leather, employed people, as readied for use for saddles, straps, bags and garments.  Shamley Green was formed into a parish from Wonersh in 1881 at which time the 1st Baron Ashcombe did not part with the advowson of Shamley Green, but did of Wonersh, to Selwyn College, Cambridge.

In 1905 Barnett Hill was chosen to be built on for the first time, by the grandson of Thomas Cook, Frank Cook, who lavished £35,000 on constructing a Queen Anne-style mansion.  The house later passed to the Red Cross who owned it until 2006 – today, it is a hotel, conference and events venue managed by the Sundial Group.

Geography
Flanked by two round hills, Chinthurst Hill (121 m) north west of the village and Barnett Hill (112 m) east of the village, the village centre ranges between 40 and 50 m above sea level.  Two-thirds of the pine heath and mixed forest-covered high ground Blackheath is included in Wonersh as are the settlements/neighbourhoods of Shamley Green, Blackheath, Ridgebridge Hill, Whipley, Plonk's Hill, Woodhill, Lordshill Common and Norley Common.

Spanning three to six miles SSE of Guildford. and in the outer London commuter belt, the centre of the village is 28 miles (45 km) southwest of London.

Elevations, geology and soil
The parish rises from west to east up the eroded basin of the Cranleigh Water holding the villages to the flint, clay, greensand and sandy soil topped Greensand Ridge.  Elevations vary from 39 m AOD by the Bramley/Wonersh bridge over the Cranleigh Water to 207 m at the car park on Winterfold Hill, Winterfold Heath.

Geologically the landscape demonstrates the contrast between the retention of the top of the Greensand Ridge from coastal deposition (geology) followed by avoiding sea rise changes and the formation of the lower Weald because of water erosion on the three-county-sized calciferous and sandy beds south of this ridge.  The Ridge forms the highest hills in the south east, excluding the southwest Berkshire Downs.

Soil is slowly permeable loamy/clayey slightly acid but base-rich soil except for the higher ground including Blackheath which is slightly acid only freely draining sandy soils containing small areas of wet impeded drainage heathland soil.

Demography and housing

The average level of accommodation in the region composed of detached houses was 28%, the average that was apartments was 22.6%.

The proportion of households in the civil parish who owned their home outright compares to the regional average of 35.1%.  The proportion who owned their home with a loan compares to the regional average of 32.5%.  The remaining % is made up of rented dwellings (plus a negligible % of households living rent-free).

In 2001, Wonersh parish contained 3,297 residents of which 19.8% were aged over 65; 5.2% of the population were in full-time further education; 75.5% of all men were economically active whereas 2.2% were unemployed, 4.8% worked part-time; 57.6% of all women were economically active whereas 1.7% were unemployed, 34.8% worked part-time.

Wonersh's economy is predominantly a service sector economy reflected by the lower end of the official categorisation table of occupation given, compiled from the 2001 census:

Whereas in this census, 34.6% of the population worked in middle or higher professional occupations.

Economy
Wonersh's economy is predominantly a service sector economy with its access to Shalford and Guildford stations and road links to the Compton interchange of the A3 road from Shalford it is part of the London Commuter Belt.   Large eastern areas are managed by workers from Surrey Wildlife Trust and the commons and sports grounds are supported by woodsmen, woodswomen and maintenance staff funded by Parish Councils.

Culture and community
Many of the societies and clubs in the villages of Wonersh and Shamley Green are community-run without parish council intervention or support such as amateur dramatics and sports clubs.  However cricket grounds, paths, commons and events are sponsored and organised by the village associations and the Wonersh Parish Council. Shamley Green has two village halls for private and community events.

Sports 
Wonersh village green where local teams play football, cricket and stoolball. The sports club have built a pavilion there with a bar, meeting room and changing facilities.

Wonersh Bowling Club is situated in the heart of the village at the end of a lane behind the Memorial Hall.  It has a close view of Chinthurst Hill. The club was founded in 1925 by J.M. Courage, F. H. Cook, R. H. Haslam and F. Rogerson.  The club is affiliated to both the English and Surrey Bowling Associations.

The bowling green, comprising six full sized rinks, is maintained by a team of groundsmen who are, themselves, active bowling members of the club. The pavilion has, in addition to the usual changing rooms and dining area, a kitchen and fully licensed bar.  The bowling season runs from the beginning of April through to the end of September.

Societies 
Wonersh Players are a well established amateur dramatic society that write, produce and perform their own pantomimes. The Wonersh Players have been in existence since 1982, always performing at the Wonersh Memorial Hall, usually during the February half term holiday, with rehearsals starting the previous October.

In 1993 Wonersh History Society was formed to preserve and build on a quantity of historical material and notes gathered over many years by the late Anthony Fanshaw. Much of this archive is now being transferred to the Society's computer data base and will be available.

A social club named Wonersh Village Club, which was founded about 110 years ago. It provides a venue for playing snooker, billiards, darts and all manner of card games.

There is an active Wonersh U3A and a Gardening Club.

Localities

 

Wonersh is situated in a gap between two steep hills in front of the Cranleigh Waters stream: Chinthurst Hill with wooded paths and land managed by Surrey Wildlife Trust which had a manor on it and now has a folly and a listed farm at its foot and; Barnett Hill which is the conference, wedding and meeting venue managed by Sunrise Group and was built in 1905 by Thomas Cook.

In a meadow by this stream the Church of England church is called St John the Baptist which had tower crenellations added in 1751, has a 12th-century bell tower, 13th-century chancel, 15th-century north chapel and 1793 south aisle including transept. The ecclesiastical parish is joined with Blackheath and lies within the Guildford diocese.

There is also a United Reformed church which overlooks the village common.  There is a large college built in 1891 (St John's Seminary) for the training of Roman Catholic priests, built in the Italian Renaissance style.

Wonersh has a village shop and post office which is owned by a village co-operative. There is also a small art gallery next door. A scout group trains and enriches the lives of young people in the village.  The Grantley Arms is the central pub/restaurant, which is often used for functions and also has a bar food menu. Both the shop and the pub are situated in the centre of the village by the pepper pot, which is a small shelter.

Doctors have the area's surgery opposite the post office. Its purpose-built right wing was opened in 1972 and extended in 1982.

Blackheath

Blackheath is often called Blackheath Village to distinguish it from Blackheath in south east London.  The settlement appears in the Domesday Book as Blacheatfeld. Blackheath as a hundred (not marked on its Surrey map, which shows only Domesday manors), an administrative area, where local leaders met about once a month. Blackheath is architecturally a Victorian heathland settlement with pioneering Arts and Crafts movement buildings by Harrison Townsend. Its church, which has remarkable stained glass (see Landmarks) is a listed building. It is a lightly wooded east–west lineal settlement in the elevated, wooded heath. St Martin's church, built in 1893 based upon the design of an Italian wayside chapel, contains some wall painting from 1894/5 by the American artist Anna Lea Merritt.

Shamley Green

Shamley Green is a village part of the Surrey Hills Area of Outstanding Natural Beauty between Wonersh and Cranleigh. It is bordered on the east by Blackheath and in the west by the Cranleigh Water.  Blackheath is separated by farmland and footpaths in Reelhall Hill and Woodhill. Two 300m footpaths, traversing Lordshill Common, connect the middle of the village to The Wey South Path from Guildford to Cranleigh which was historically the Cranleigh Railway Line.

Two areas of public open space in the village include the Cricket Green that hosts occasional summer fairs. The Red Lion and the Bricklayers Arms are pubs in the village. There are several shops and there are schools.  Shamley Green Conservation Area contains 22 listed buildings with 10 others on the village outskirts. Shamley Green is a large irregular shaped green that is quite exposed and flat with little or no trees. None of the buildings are graded Grade II* or I.

In 2013, BBC Two featured the village in the Horizon episode The Secret Life of the Cat, stating that Shamley Green has the highest density feline population in the United Kingdom.

Willinghurst Copses forming the west of Winterfold Forest and Heath
This forested area of the southeast adjoins Winterfold Forest.  In its middle is Willingshurst House, an 1887 Arts and Crafts property by Philip Webb, sometimes called the father of arts and crafts and son of commercial and residential buildings architect Sir Aston Webb. Spring Wood, The Shaws, The Ball; Madgehole, South, Great, Dean, Pithouse, Rock and Lapscombe Copses are the names for sections of the forest.  A car park is on top of Winterfold Heath on the Cranleigh parish boundary in the middle of the southern Winterfold Heath section.

South of the main forest is a series of 11 woodland lakes – one is large enough to allow boats – used for fishing and woodland walks.

Landmarks
Wonersh Conservation Area contains 27 listed buildings – at least ten of which are early and late Tudor period – however none in the highest Grade I category. Just north of the village centre however is the only Grade I listed building, moated Great Tangley Manor.

The Dower House
Architecturally Grade II*-listed the Dower House is the largest building on a long residential lane off Cranleigh Road, Barnett Lane at the end east of the street. In 1710 most all of its exterior was built – the date of foundations and chimneys is uncertain – in red brick with plain hipped tiles and five 12-pane glazing bar sash windows to its first floor. Its architectural features represent typical authentic Queen Anne style architecture.

Wonersh Court
At the opposite end of The Street behind a large listed entrance arch, are eight courtyard townhouses, the original stables and parade ring to the demolished mansion Wonersh Park, converted and divided in 1745–1759 by the owner Sir Fletcher Norton, first Lord Grantley. Red and brown brick with some blue brick headers in arches over windows, painted weatherboard to first floor of rear (south) range.  Architecturally the building is Grade II-listed.

Great Tangley Manor
In the 15th century a hall house core was built on its motte that remains in the very core of the manor, but its main portion was built by Richard Caryll in 1584. Wickham Flower employed Philip Webb to restore and extend the house in 1884 and in 1906 Colonel Hegan Kennard employed Inigo Thomas to build the north wing.

Set a few metres above a narrow square moat, Great Tangley Manor has been well preserved and has been made the subject of many paintings as have its garden and lily pond, well described and illustrated. A long entrance tunnel added by Philip Webb, with one sandstone and brick wall and open timber 12-bay arcade on the other, crosses the moat. This medieval and Elizabethan highest-listed building is open for film shoots, board meetings and has Victorian gardens. The main front facing south-east is decorative timber frame with whitewashed render infill and remainder is brick and whitewashed extensions on the south wing, ashlar ground floor and roughcast above on rounded north wing.

Barnett Hill
Architecturally Grade II*-listed Barnett Hill's social history is described in History, its architect was Arnold Mitchell who chose an expensive and ornate masonry Carolean style. Purple/brown bricks with red brick and yellow stone dressings form its walls.  Roofing consists of hipped plain tiled several roof slopes over a wooden eaves cornice around its roof, incorporating dormer windows.  Spread over three above ground floors the venue is on a short H-shaped plan with a long service wing in an identical style.  Ground floor windows have 24 panes each and keystone lintels.  In the angles between wings are square turrets and a recessed range under copper ogee domes with spherical finials.

Christ Church, Shamley Green

Christ Church is towards the end of the main street (B road) towards Cranleigh in the south of Shamley Green and is a Grade II listed building. The churchyard is the resting pace of television presenter Tony Hart who lived in the village for more than 40 years.

St Martin's Church Blackheath

Colourful stained glass and imposing arches are in Blackheath's Grade II-listed church, St Martin's, which is its only listed building. The murals are by the American artist Anna Lea Merritt.

Chinthurst Hill

A 1930s folly tower tops this 397-foot (121-metre above sea level) knoll.  Surrey Wildlife Trust manage the hill's woodland and tower.  It is the 31st highest hill in the county and a stand-alone outcrop of the Greensand Ridge which restarts in parishes east and west on its course from Hampshire to Kent.

Transport

Roads meeting in the village centre are the B2128 from Guildford to Cranleigh and the B2120 (which becomes the A248) in the next village north, Shalford where it meets an east-west A road leading to the A25.

The nearest railway station is Shalford railway station on the Reading to Gatwick Airport via Guildford Line.

Education
Shamley Green Montessori Pre-School - closed in approx 2017
Wonersh Preschool
Wonersh and Shamley Green C of E Primary School
Longacre School ages 2–11 (independent)

Other notable residents
William Howard Seth-Smith III (1852–1928), architect, born in the hamlet of Tangley
Tony Hart (1925–2009), artist and TV presenter, lived in Shamley Green for more than 40 years.
The Irish actor Max Adrian died in Shamley Green in 1973.

See also
List of places of worship in Waverley (borough)

References
Notes 
  
References

External links

 Whole Parish main menu – Wonersh Parish Council
  Wonersh main menu – Wonersh Parish Council
 Blackheath, Shamley Green, Wonersh Village Design Statement
 Wonersh Our Village, with information about the people of Wonersh, and their families

Shamley Green
 Shamley Green main menu – Wonersh Parish Council
 Stained Glass Windows at Christ Church, Shamley Green, Surrey
 Archive pictures

Blackheath
 Blackheath main menu – Wonersh Parish Council

Villages in Surrey
Borough of Waverley
Civil parishes in Surrey